OBN (abbreviation of Open Broadcast Network) is a local television network broadcasting a TV channel in Bosnia and Herzegovina. Headquarters of this TV is in Sarajevo, Pofalići neighborhood.

OBN originally stood for Open Broadcast Network, when the company was founded in 1996 by the Office of the High Representative and the European Union. It was oriented towards general news, and the international owners invested some 20 million USD in its development as a neutral television channel.

The station became privately owned in 2000, when it was acquired by Ivan Ćaleta, a Croatian entrepreneur and former owner of Nova TV. Later, Chellomedia bought 85% stake in the television. Ćaleta bought back AMC Networks International's 85% stake in the television channel in November 2019, making him the sole owner of the channel once again.

Programmes

Telenovelas / Series since October 2019

Logos 
From 1996, for this Bosnian television channel, there was four different logos. The first logo of the channel has been in use from 1996 to 1999, the second logo has been in use from 1999 to 2005, the third logo has been is in use from 2005 to 2008, and the fourth and current logo is in use from 2008.

References

External links
 Televizija OBN - official web site

AMC Networks International
Television stations in Bosnia and Herzegovina
Television channels in North Macedonia
Mass media in Sarajevo
Television channels and stations established in 1996